Reggie Elliot Geary (born August 31, 1973) is a retired American professional basketball guard for the NBA's Cleveland Cavaliers and San Antonio Spurs. Since 2011 he has coached several teams in Japan's professional basketball leagues.

Geary played college basketball at the University of Arizona under head coach Lute Olson. As a player at Arizona, the Wildcats had a 104–23 (.819) record, two Pac-10 Conference championships, and an appearance in the 1994 Final Four. He remains Arizona's fourth all-time steals leader (208) and sixth all-time leader in assists (560). Aside from his NBA career, Geary played two seasons in the Continental Basketball Association (1998 to 2000), and in Israel, Portugal, France and Ukraine. He played with the jersey number 2 or 4.

In 2005, Geary became recruiting and basketball operations coordinator at Arizona, working under Lute Olson. He then became head coach of the NBA D-League's Anaheim Arsenal for 18 months, before returning to Olson's staff as an assistant coach in 2008. From 2009 to 2011, Geary was an assistant coach at Southern Methodist University under head coach Matt Doherty.

In 2012, Geary was named coach of the year while at the helm for the Japanese professional basketball league's Yokohama B-Corsairs. The following season, Geary led the B-Corsairs to the league title, becoming the league's first foreign-born coach to win the championship.

He left the B-Corsairs at the end of the 2012–13 season due to the club's financial difficulties. In July 2013 he signed to coach the Chiba Jets, a team which was moving from the bj-league to the National Basketball League during the same off-season. After an 18–36 record in 2013–14, Geary led the Jets to the NBL playoffs in 2014–15 with a 34–20 record.

Geary's contract with the Jets was not renewed at the end of the 2014–15 season. He signed with the Mitsubishi Diamond Dolphins Nagoya of the NBL in June 2015 and led the team to a seventh-place 27–28 record in the 2015–16 season, losing in the first round of the playoffs to Link Tochigi Brex.

Head coaching record

|- 
| style="text-align:left;"|Yokohama B-Corsairs
| style="text-align:left;"|2011–12
|52||31||21|||| style="text-align:center;"|2nd in Eastern|||5||3||2||
| style="text-align:center;"|3rd place
|-
|- style="background:#FDE910;"
| style="text-align:left;"|Yokohama B-Corsairs
| style="text-align:left;"|2012–13
|52||35||17|||| style="text-align:center;"|2nd in Eastern|||5||4||1||
| style="text-align:center;"|Bj Champions
|-
| style="text-align:left;"|Chiba Jets
| style="text-align:left;"|2013–14
|54||18||36|||| style="text-align:center;"|6th in Eastern|||-||-||-||
| style="text-align:center;"|-
|-
| style="text-align:left;"|Chiba Jets
| style="text-align:left;"|2014–15
|54||34||20|||| style="text-align:center;"|5th in Eastern|||2||0||2||
| style="text-align:center;"|6th
|-
| style="text-align:left;"|Mitsubishi Electric
| style="text-align:left;"|2015–16
|55||27||28|||| style="text-align:center;"|7th|||2||0||2||
| style="text-align:center;"|5th
|-
| style="text-align:left;"|Nagoya Diamond Dolphins
| style="text-align:left;"|2016–17
|60||27||33|||| style="text-align:center;"|5th in Western|||-||-||-||
| style="text-align:center;"|-
|-

Notes

External links
Career statistics

1973 births
Living people
American expatriate basketball people in France
American expatriate basketball people in Israel
American expatriate basketball people in Japan
American expatriate basketball people in Portugal
American expatriate basketball people in Ukraine
American men's basketball coaches
American men's basketball players
Arizona Wildcats men's basketball coaches
Arizona Wildcats men's basketball players
Basketball coaches from New Jersey
Basketball players from Trenton, New Jersey
BC Kyiv players
Chiba Jets Funabashi coaches
Cleveland Cavaliers draft picks
Cleveland Cavaliers players
FC Porto basketball players
Harlem Globetrotters players
Nagoya Diamond Dolphins coaches
Point guards
San Antonio Spurs players
SMU Mustangs men's basketball coaches
Yokohama B-Corsairs coaches